Arnaud Lescure (born 13 February 1986) is a French footballer who plays Championnat de France amateur for Balma SC. While at Monaco, Lescure spent loan spells at Toulon and Rodez AF.

External links
 Player profile at AS Monaco
 Player profile at L'Equipe

1986 births
Living people
French footballers
AS Monaco FC players
SC Toulon players
Ligue 1 players
Rodez AF players
Balma SC players
Association football defenders